At Worst... The Best of Boy George and Culture Club is a greatest hits album featuring the biggest hits from 1982 to 1993 of Boy George's career as a solo singer as well as with the bands Culture Club and Jesus Loves You. It was released on 20 September 1993.

It was the third Culture Club retrospective following 1987's This Time – The First Four Years and 1989's The Best of Culture Club

While the album features most of Boy George's and Culture Club's hit singles up to that point, there were several notable omissions including "The War Song" (UK #2), "Mistake No.3", "The Medal Song" (UK #32) and "To Be Reborn" (UK #13).

Track listing

Charts and certifications

Weekly charts

Certifications

References 

Culture Club albums
1993 greatest hits albums
Albums produced by Steve Levine